Carasmatic is Irene Cara's third and final studio album released in 1987. It was her only album for Elektra Records. The album was mostly produced by George Duke. Many popular musicians also contributed to this album such as Luther Vandross, Lynn Davis, James Ingram, Patrice Rushen, Bonnie Raitt, Carole King, John Farrar  and Michael Bolton. The album, however, sold poorly and failed to make an impression on the charts.

The lead single "Girlfriends" failed to generate enough sales or airplay to crack the Hot 100.

Track listing 
 "Get a Grip" (Debbie Johnson, George Johnson, Cara) - 4:58
 "Give Me Love" (Michael Bolton, Patrick Henderson) - 3:58
 "We're Gonna Get Up" (Danny Sembello, David Batteau) - 4:42
 "Now That It's Over" (Doug James, Bolton) - 4:20
 "Say Goodnight Irene" (Cara, John Farrar) - 4:38
 "Don't Wanna Let Go" (James, Bolton) - 3:32
 "Girlfriends" (Gordon Grody, Cara) - 4:14
 "Be Your Number One" (Gerald Tillman, Harold Allen Jr., Yolanda "Yo-Yo" Smith) - 5:31
 "Falling in Love" (Bill Seidman) - 4:03

Personnel 
 Irene Cara – lead vocals, backing vocals (1, 5, 8), acoustic piano (1), additional backing vocals (2), additional backing vocal solo (3), Synclavier (5, 7), Yamaha DX7 solo (5), arrangements (7), BGV arrangements (8)
 George Johnson – keyboards (1), synth bass (1), guitars (1, 8), guitar solo (1), bass guitar (1), arrangements (1, 8), additional backing vocal solo (3)
 Steve Robbins – synthesizer solo (1), Synclavier piano (7), synthesizers (7), Fender Rhodes (9), Minimoog (9), Oberheim OB-Xa (9)
 George Duke – acoustic piano (2), Prophet-5 (2, 4, 6), Synclavier (2, 6, 7), Memorymoog (2, 4, 6), Linn 9000 (2), arrangements (2, 3, 4, 6), Yamaha TX816 (4), Yamaha DX7 (6), LinnDrum (6)
 Danny Sembello – Yamaha DX7 (3), Roland JX-8P (3), Linn 9000 (3)
 Randy Kerber – acoustic piano (4), Yamaha DX7 (4)
 John Farrar – Synclavier (5), Yamaha TX816 horns (5), vocoder (5), guitar (5), backing vocal solo (5)
 Marcus Ryle – Oberheim Matrix-12 (5), Kurzweil K250 (5), Synclavier (5)
 Patrice Rushen – keyboards (8), synth bass (8)
 Frank Owens – acoustic piano (9)
 Paul Jackson, Jr. – guitars (2, 4, 6, 7)
 Freddie Washington – bass guitar (4)
 Louis Johnson – bass guitar (8)
 Harvey Mason – drums (1), Simmons tom fills (1)
 John Robinson – drums (2), Simmons tom fills (3, 6)
 Jim Keltner – drums (5)
 Harold Allen – drum sequencing (8)
 Paulinho da Costa – percussion (3)
 David Diggs – horn arrangements (1, 2)
 George Del Barrio – string arrangements (4)
 Gordon Grody – co-arrangements (7)
 Bill Seidman – arrangements (9)
 Charlotte Crossley – backing vocals (1, 6, 7), additional backing vocals (8)
 Jo Ann Harris – backing vocals (1)
 David Lasley – backing vocals (1, 6)
 Paulette McWilliams – backing vocals (1)
 Luther Vandross – backing vocals (1), BGV arrangements (1)
 Terry Bradford – backing vocals (2, 3)
 Daryl Carpenter – additional backing vocals (2), backing vocal solo (8)
 Patrick Henderson – backing vocals (2, 3)
 Jacquelyn Gouche – backing vocals (2, 3)
 Joel Osborne – additional backing vocals (2)
 Sybil Thomas – additional backing vocals (2)
 Fred White – backing vocals (2, 3)
 Elisecia Wright – backing vocals (2, 3)
 Lynn Davis – backing vocals (6)
 Joyce Kennedy – backing vocals (7), group vocals (8)
 Carole King – backing vocals (7)
 Bonnie Raitt – backing vocals (7)
 Wanda Vaughn – backing vocals (7)
 Syreeta Wright – backing vocals (7)
 Pat McKenna – additional backing vocals (8)
 Yolanda Smith – additional backing vocals (8)
 Jim Gilstrap – group vocals (8)
 James Ingram – group vocals (8)

Production 
 George Johnson – producer (1, 8), engineer (8)
 Irene Cara – co-producer (1, 9), executive producer 
 George Duke – producer (2, 3, 4, 6, 7)
 John Farrar – producer (5)
 Bill Seidman – producer (9)
 John Pace – engineer (1)
 Erik Zobler – engineer (2, 3, 4, 6)
 Allen Sides – engineer (5), mixing (5)
 Tim Wilson – engineer (5)
 Paul McKenna – engineer (8)
 Michael Barbiero – mixing (1, 6, 7, 8), mix supervision (8)
 Tommy Vicari – mixing (2), string recording (4), engineer (7)
 Michael Brauer – mixing (3, 4, 9)
 Steve Thompson – mixing (6, 7, 8), mix supervision (8)
 Dave Easton – assistant engineer (1)
 Mitch Gibson – assistant engineer (3, 4, 6)
 Brian Gardner – LP mastering 
 Stephen Innocenzi – CD mastering 
 Bob Defrin – art direction, design 
 Antonio Lopez – cover artwork 
 Jeff Tomberg – management

Studios 
 Recorded at Ocean Way Recording, Sunset Sound and LeGonks West (Hollywood, CA); Westlake Studios, Cherokee Studios, Lion Share Recording Studios and The Village Recorder (Los Angeles, CA); Gate Way (Santa Barbara, CA); Altadena Sound (Altadena, CA); Moonee Ponds Studios (Malibu, CA); Metropolis (Studio City, CA); Nimbus 9 (New York City, NY).
 Mixed at Mediasound (New York City, NY); Lion Share Recording Studios and Record Plant (Los Angeles, CA).

References

External links
 

1987 albums
Irene Cara albums
Albums produced by John Farrar
Elektra Records albums